Kevin McCormick is an American film producer.

Biography
McCormick started his career at RSO Records in London. He then co-produced films with actress Sally Field and later had a production deal at Paramount Pictures. He later served as Executive Vice President of Production at Fox 2000. He served as Production President at Warner Bros. from 1999 to 2009. He was appointed as the Executive Vice President of Production and as a senior adviser in May 2017. He is on the Motion Picture & Television Fund (MPTF) Board of Governors

Filmography
He was producer for all films unless otherwise noted.

Film

Thanks

Television

References

External links

Living people
Year of birth missing (living people)
American film producers
Place of birth missing (living people)